The NAACP Image Award for Outstanding News, Talk, Or Information - Special was an award formed out of the award Outstanding News, Talk or Information (which started in 1989) and lasted until 1996 when the award was split into two categories; one for Series and one for Special. This thus gives the page its name. In 1997 the awards for series and special where merged into Outstanding News, Talk or Information Series/Special. Then Special was split into its separate award again in 1998 where it remained as a category until 2003 when it was remerged into one category Outstanding News, Talk or Information - Series or Special. These are the winners for Outstanding News, Talk, or Information - Special.

Winners and nominees

Multiple wins and nominations

They were no multiple winners, however Biography, ABC News Nightline, and BET Tonight were nominated four times, two times, and two times, respectively.

See also

 List of American television awards

References

NAACP Image Awards
American television awards